The Flag Bearer (Persian: Parcham-dar) is a 1984 film by the Iranian director Shahriar Bahrani. Bahrani also wrote the script for the film which was lensed by Abbas Soleimani. 	Abbas Naseri, Dehkharghani Seyed, Ahmad Mir, Alaei Reza Agharabi, Hojjatollah Goodarzi starred in the principal roles. Set during the Iran Iraq war, the film is an early example of Sacred Defence cinema.

Cast

References

Iranian war drama films
1980s war films
1984 films
Iran–Iraq War films